Turks in Finland, also referred to as Turkish Finns or Finnish Turks, (or Finlandiya'da yaşayan Türkler  or Suomessa asuvat turkkilaiset) are the ethnic Turkish people living in Finland, including Finnish-born persons who have Turkish parents or a Turkish ancestral background. The majority of Finnish Turks descend from the Republic of Turkey; however there has also been significant Turkish migration from other post-Ottoman countries including ethnic Turkish communities which have come to Finland from the Balkans (e.g. Bulgaria, Greece, Kosovo, North Macedonia and Romania), the island of Cyprus, and more recently Iraq and Syria.

History 
Turkish migration to Finland is a relatively new phenomenon in the country; the majority have predominantly arrived since the late 1980s and are made up of largely male immigrants. Thus, many Turkish adolescents have a Finnish mother. Between 1987 and 2012 there have been 8,904 Turkish citizens who have migrated to Finland. In 2019, Turkish asylum seekers are the second largest group after Iraqis. From January to August, 283 Turkish citizens have sought asylum, while for the whole of 2018 it was 293. Their number by the end of the year is projected to be 45% more than the last year. According to Finnish Immigration Service, many Turks are seeking asylum due to the Gülen movement.

Demographics 
According to Statistics Finland, the majority of Turks live in the Uusimaa region with smaller communities in Pirkanmaa, Varsinais-Suomi, North Ostrobothnia, and Kymenlaakso.

8,127 speak Turkish, making Turkish the 14th most spoken language in Finland. There are 4,794 Turkish citizens, while 7,472 are born in Turkey. There are 7,221 first generation Turkish immigrants in Finland and 2,135 second generation immigrants for a total of 9,356.

Society
65.5% of them are male while 34.5% are female. 22.2% are less than 14 years old, 76.7% are between 15 and 64 years old and only 1.1% are over the age 65.

The majority of Turkish immigrants are self-employed and are predominantly active in the restaurant and fast food sector.

Organizations
 Suomen turkkilainen seura

Political activism 
Turkey demanded that Finland ends its alleged support for the Gülen movement.

Notable people

Mehmet Gürs, chef (Turkish father) 
, women's activist and public enlightener (her mother, Adolfina Sofia Soldan, was a descendant of  who was the first documented Turk in Germany)
Ibrahim Köse, football player 
Kaan Kairinen, football player (Turkish father) 
Melek Mazici, visual artist 
Anton Odabasi, basketball player (Turkish father) 
Mert Otsamo, fashion designer (Turkish father) 
Masar Ömer, football player
Hasan Fuat Sari, sculptor
Teuvo Tulio, film director 
Ozan Yanar, former member of the Finnish Parliament
, singer (Turkish father)

See also  
Finland–Turkey relations
Kebakko
Turks in Europe
Turks in Denmark  
Turks in Norway
Turks in Russia
Turks in Sweden
Finnish Tatars
Kurds in Finland
Islam in Finland

References

Bibliography 

 
 
 .

Ethnic groups in Finland
Finland–Turkey relations
 
Middle Eastern diaspora in Finland
Muslim communities in Europe
Finland
Finland
Islam in Finland